These Russian or Soviet submarines either suffered extensive crew casualties or were entirely lost to enemy action or to "storm or perils of the sea." A dagger (†) indicates that the boat was lost.  

This list is not known to be complete.

According to the U.S. Navy, "The former Soviet Union secretly disposed of about 16 submarines by sinking them in the northern oceans."

See also the list of Russian or Soviet submarines.

Before the Russian Revolution 
 Дельфин (Delfin) (1904) †

Before World War II 
 Shch-103 (1935, storm)
 D-1 (1940, sea trials)
 S-2 (1940, Winter War)

During World War II

1941 
Baltic Fleet
 L-2
 M-71 (scuttled)
 M-74
 M-80 (scuttled)
 M-81
 M-83 (scuttled)
 M-94
 M-98
 M-99
 M-103
 S-1 (scuttled)
 S-3 
 S-5
 S-6
 S-8
 S-10
 S-11
 Kalev
 Ronis (scuttled)
 Spidola (scuttled)
 Shch-301
 Shch-319
 Shch-322
 Shch-324

Black Sea Fleet
 D-6 (scuttled)
 M-34
 M-58
 M-59
 S-34
 Shch-204
 Shch-206
 Shch-211

Pacific Fleet
 L-16
 M-57
 M-63

1942 
Baltic Fleet
 M-95 †
 M-97 †
 S-7 †
 Shch-302 †
 Shch-304 †
 Shch-305 †
 Shch-306 †
 Shch-308 †
 Shch-311 †
 Shch-317 † 
 Shch-320 †

Black Sea Fleet
 A-1 (scuttled)
 M-31 †
 M-33 †
 M-60 † 
 M-118 †
 S-32 †
 Shch-208 † 
 Shch-210 †
 Shch-212 †
 Shch-213 †
 Shch-214 †

Northern Fleet
 D-3 † 
 L-24 †
 K-2 †
 K-23 †
 M-121 †
 M-173 †
 M-175 †
 M-176 † 
 Shch-401 †
 Shch-405 † 
 Shch-421 † (intentionally sunk after hitting mines)

Pacific Fleet
 L-16 †
 Shch-138 (blew up due to torpedo explosion)

1943 
Baltic Fleet
 S-9 †
 S-12 †
 Shch-323
 Shch-406 †
 Shch-408 †

Black Sea Fleet
 A-3 †
 D-4 †
 Shch-203 †

Northern Fleet
 К-1 † 
 К-3 †
 К-22 †
 M-106 †
 M-122 †
 M-172 †
 M-174 †
 S-55 †
 Shch-403 †
 Shch-406 †
 Shch-408 †
 Shch-422 †

1944 
Baltic Fleet
 M-96 †

Black Sea Fleet
 L-6 †
 L-23 †
 M-36 †
 Shch-216 † 

Northern Fleet
 M-108 †
 S-54 †

1945 
Baltic Fleet
 S-4 †

Pacific Fleet
 L-19 †

After World War II 
 S-117 (1952) †
 M-200 Месть (Mest) (1956) †
  (1957) †
 К-19 (1961)
 S-80 (1961)
 B-37 (1962) †
  (1962)
  (1968) †
 K-27 (1968) †
 K-8 (1970) †
  (1973)
 S-178 (1981)
 K-429 (1983)
 K-131 (1984)
 K-219 (1986) †
  (1989) †

After the fall of the Soviet Union 
  (2000) †
 K-159 (2003) †

The Komsomolets Nuclear Submarine Memorial Society aids the dependents of sailors lost in these disasters.

References

Submarines of the Russian Navy
Russian or Soviet